The Seal of the U.S. Department of Homeland Security is the symbol of the United States Department of Homeland Security (DHS) and is used to represent the organization and authenticate certain official documents.

The seal was developed with input from senior DHS leadership, employees, and the U.S. Commission on Fine Arts. The Ad Council, which partners with DHS on its Ready.gov campaign, and the consulting company Landor Associates were responsible for graphic design and maintaining heraldic integrity. The seal is also featured on the DHS flag, which consists of the seal itself emblazoned on a blue background.

History

The U.S. Department of Homeland Security was formed in November 2002, succeeding the U.S. Office of Homeland Security (OHS), which was created in October 2001 in response to the September 11 attacks. Whereas the OHS was a subsidiary office of the Executive Office of the President (EOP), the DHS is an independent, cabinet-level department.

From the creation of the agency in late 2002 until the adoption of a dedicated departmental seal in 2003, the DHS utilized a slightly-modified version of the U.S. great seal.

The seal was developed with input from senior DHS leadership, employees, and the U.S. Commission on Fine Arts. The Ad Council, which partners with DHS on its Ready.gov campaign, and the consulting company Landor Associates were responsible for graphic design and maintaining heraldic integrity. The seal is also featured on the DHS flag, which consists of the seal itself emblazoned on a blue background.

The colors of the seal are specified as "Homeland Security Blue", specified as 2955 C on the Pantone Matching System, "Homeland Security Gray", specified as Cool Gray 6 C on the Pantone Matching System, "Homeland Security Red", specified as 187 C on the Pantone Matching System, "Homeland Security Light Blue", specified as 307 C on the Pantone Matching System, and "Homeland Security Green", specified as 370 C on the Pantone Matching System.

In June 2003, several months after the DHS was created, the DHS seal was unveiled. A DHS press release dated June 19, 2003 describes the seal as follows:

The seal is prominently featured on the organizational flag of the U.S. Department of Homeland Security, which consists of the seal on a rectangular blue background of Pantone #2955C.

References

External links
 
 U.S. Department of Homeland Security Seal and Signature Usage Guidelines

Homeland Security, Department of
Homeland Security, Department of
United States Department of Homeland Security